The 1984 Winter Olympics torch relay was run from 29 January 1984 until 8 February 1984 prior to the 1984 Winter Olympics in Sarajevo, Yugoslavia. Sanda Dubravčić lit the cauldron at the opening ceremony.

Route

East Yugoslavia

West Yugoslavia

References

External links
1980 torch relay via IOC website

Torch Relay, 1984 Winter Olympics
Olympic torch relays